Janice Monakana (born 6 August 1995) is a British basketball player for Sevenoaks Suns and the Great Britain national team.

She represented Great Britain at the FIBA Women's EuroBasket 2019.

References

External links

1995 births
Living people
British expatriate basketball people in the United States
British women's basketball players
English women's basketball players
Forwards (basketball)
People from Edgware